Iván Marcos Guillauma Modernell (born September 20, 1977) is an Uruguayan former footballer.

Born in San José de Mayo, Guillauma spent most of his football career playing in Chile. He had spells with Cobresal and Cobreloa. In 2008, Cobreloa manager Marco Antonio Figueroa and Guillauma had a conflict, resulting in Guillauma leaving the club.

References

External links
 Soccerway Profile
 Guillauma at Football-Lineups

1977 births
Living people
Uruguayan footballers
Uruguayan expatriate footballers
Association football midfielders
C.A. Progreso players
Rentistas players
Cobreloa footballers
Cobresal footballers
Santiago Morning footballers
San Marcos de Arica footballers
Deportes Iquique footballers
Expatriate footballers in Chile